Leonard Walters (born 27 November 1931) is a Canadian boxer. He competed in the men's featherweight event at the 1952 Summer Olympics.

References

1931 births
Living people
Canadian male boxers
Olympic boxers of Canada
Boxers at the 1952 Summer Olympics
Place of birth missing (living people)
Commonwealth Games medallists in boxing
Commonwealth Games bronze medallists for Canada
Boxers at the 1950 British Empire Games
Featherweight boxers
Medallists at the 1950 British Empire Games